Most of the 2006 national road cycling championships took place in June, although there were a few exceptions such as the Australian and American championships which take place in January and September respectively.

Jerseys
The winner of each national championship wears the national jersey in all their races for the next year in the respective discipline, apart from the World Championships. The jerseys tend to represent the countries' flag or use the colours from it.

2006 National Champions

Note: In some cases the U23 champion is the highest placed U23 rider in the elite men's race.

References

2006 in road cycling
2006